Semoy may refer to:

 Semois, or Semoy, a river in Belgium and France
 Semoy, Loiret, France, a commune